This is a chronological list of films produced in Sweden and in the Swedish language in alphabetical order ordered by decade of release on separate pages. For an A-Z see :Category:Swedish films

Pre-1930
 Swedish films before 1930

1930s
Swedish films of the 1930s

1940s
Swedish films of the 1940s

1950s
Swedish films of the 1950s

1960s
Swedish films of the 1960s

1970s
Swedish films of the 1970s

1980s
Swedish films of the 1980s

1990s
Swedish films of the 1990s

2000s
Swedish films of the 2000s

2010s
Swedish films of the 2010s

2020s
Swedish films of the 2020s

External links
 Swedish film at the Internet Movie Database